Marcus Aponius Saturninus was a Senator of Imperial Rome, active in the latter half of the first century AD. His parents, also of senatorial rank, were wealthy and owned property in Egypt. He appears in the Acta Arvalia in the year 57 AD; classicist Ronald Syme suggests that he was made a member of the Arval Brethren due to the influence of Annaeus Seneca. Saturninus is mentioned as being present in 66 for sacrifices on the Capitol with the emperor Nero. Tacitus calls him a consul, but the date of his office is uncertain. He may have been consul in 55; Classical scholar Paul Gallivan at the University of Tasmania has argued that Saturninus was suffect consul between 63 and 66, by which time he was recorded as becoming promagister.

Saturninus served as the governor of Moesia in 69, which may have been an appointment of Galba. He repulsed the Sarmatians, who had invaded the province, and was in consequence rewarded by a triumphal statue at the commencement of Otho's reign.

In the Year of the Four Emperors 
In the struggle between Vitellius and Vespasian during the Year of the Four Emperors, Saturninus with his relative Gaius Dillius Aponianus first espoused the cause of Vitellius, reporting on the fomenting rebellion in a letter to Vitellius. He seemed to only stick with Vitellius while this was a safe bet, however, and afterwards declared himself in favor of Vespasian, and crossed the Alps to join Marcus Antonius Primus in northern Italy. Saturninus decided to use the confusion of the shifting loyalties of the legions and tried to have a well-liked member of his legion killed, Tettius Julianus, who was a partisan of Vespasian in his legion and brother-in-law of Vespasian's finance minister. The pretext that Tettius was actually a secret Vitellius supporter. Primus, who was anxious to obtain the supreme command, excited a mutiny of the soldiers against Saturninus, who had after all attempted to assassinate pro-Vespasian factions in his legion. Saturninus was compelled to flee the camp.

Saturninus' fate afterwards is uncertain. While he is known to have been proconsul of Asia, although his tenure has been dated in the past to 73/74, Syme has pointed out some weaknesses in that argument, and argued that his office should instead be dated to 67/68. Based on Syme's proposed earlier date, and the fact he last appears in the records of the Arval Brethren January 69, it is possible Saturninus died not long after taking flight.

Saturninus and Caligula 
Suetonius tells the story of a man named "Aponius Saturninus" during the reign of the emperor Caligula, who may be the same as this Aponius Saturninus. In this tale, Caligula, keen to replenish the treasury he himself had depleted, decided to auction off some imperial gladiators. During the auction, Aponius Saturninus nodded off. Caligula noticed this and told the auctioneer to consider each of Aponius's nods as a bid. By the time Aponius had woken up, he'd purchased 13 gladiators for the astronomical sum of 9 million sesterces.

Notes

1st-century Romans
Saturninus, Marcus
Roman governors of Asia
Roman governors of Moesia
Suffect consuls of Imperial Rome